Victoria-Beacon Hill is a provincial electoral district for the Legislative Assembly of British Columbia, Canada.

Demographics

Geography 
The riding comprises most of the City of Victoria, the provincial capital. It is bounded by the coastline to the south and west including the downtown core; by the Municipality of Oak Bay to the east, by Bay Street and Haultain Street to the north.

History 
Victoria-Beacon Hill was created in 1989, in time for the 1991 British Columbia general election, after the abolition of the two-member district of Victoria along with all other such dual ridings. In the 2008 boundary redistribution, Victoria-Beacon Hill kept 89 per cent of its area and added nine per cent of Victoria-Hillside.

Members of Legislative Assembly
This riding has elected the following Members of Legislative Assembly:

Election results

References

External links 
BC Stats Profile - 2001
Results of 2001 election (pdf)
2001 Expenditures
Results of 1996 election
1996 Expenditures
Results of 1991 election
1991 Expenditures
Website of the Legislative Assembly of British Columbia

British Columbia provincial electoral districts on Vancouver Island
Politics of Victoria, British Columbia